Gabino Cué Monteagudo (born February 23, 1966 in Oaxaca de Juárez, Oaxaca, Mexico) is a Mexican politician.  He was previously governor of the state of Oaxaca, and the first non-PRI winning candidate in the state in 80 years.  He previously ran for governor in 2004, losing to Ulises Ruiz Ortiz, the PRI-candidate and current outgoing state governor.

Cue has also served as mayor of the state's capital city, Oaxaca de Juárez, and represented the state as a senator in the Mexican Congress.

See also 

 2004 Oaxaca state election
 Mexican gubernatorial elections, 2010

References

1966 births
Living people
People from Oaxaca City
Governors of Oaxaca
National Action Party (Mexico) politicians
Party of the Democratic Revolution politicians
Citizens' Movement (Mexico) politicians
Members of the Senate of the Republic (Mexico)
Monterrey Institute of Technology and Higher Education alumni
21st-century Mexican politicians